Spatial Corporation was founded in 1986, and had one main product: ACIS, the first commercially available 3D modeling kernel. Through subsequent years, Spatial added products to its portfolio that enabled ISVs mostly in the CAD/CAM industries, to build applications. These components included extensions and updates to the ACIS modeler, visualization products, as well as acquisitions in translator technology.

A significant transformation took place at Spatial when it was purchased by Dassault Systèmes in late 2000. Spatial Corp. became a subsidiary of Dassault Systèmes.

Flagship products 
 CGM Modeler - the 3D modeling kernel used in Dassault Systèmes’ 3DEXPERIENCE Platform.
 3D ACIS Modeler - features an open, object-oriented C++ architecture that enables robust, 3D modeling capabilities
 3D InterOp - CAD data translation framework.
 3D Visualization - the HOOPS 3D Application Framework enables the development of 3D Visualization applications with advanced 2D and 3D graphics functionality.
 3D Precise Mesh - an object-based software development toolkit providing fully configurable surface and volumetric meshing capabilities.
 Constraint Design Solver (CDS) - provides variational constraint solver solutions for design and engineering applications.

References

External links 
 Spatial Corporation Website
 CGM Core Modeler Official Website
 3D ACIS Modeler Official Website
 3D InterOp Official Website
 3D Visualization - HOOPS Visualize Official Website
 3D Precise Mesh Official Website
 Constraint Design Solver (CDS) Official Website

Computer-aided design software
Defunct software companies of the United States
Companies based in Colorado
Product lifecycle management
Dassault Group